Jean Francis Fabien Vorbe (born 4 January 1990) is a Haitian professional footballer who last played for NEROCA F.C. in the I-League.

Career

Youth and College
Vorbe began his career in 2005 with first division Haitian club Violette AC at age 15, before moving to the United States to play college soccer at Furman University in 2008.  In his freshman year, he made 17 appearances and scored four goals including two in his collegiate debut against UNC Wilmington.  In his sophomore year, he started 16 games and tallied six goals and one assist.  He made 16 appearances again in his junior year and scored four goals.

Club career
In 2011, Vorbe returned to Haiti to play for Tempête. After one season, he left Haiti to join FC Edmonton in the NASL. He was released after one season and went to play in for IFK Värnamo in Sweden.

NEROCA F.C.
Fabien Vorbe signed for  NEROCA F.C.in
2017-18 and after 18 games in which  Fabien Vorbe
played in 14 of them  NEROCA F.C
Runner up  the I-League championship.

Gokulam Kerala
Fabian signed for Gokulam Kerala for 2018–19 I-League season.

International career
Vorbe led his team to the 2007 FIFA U-17 World Cup in Korea, their first time doing so. During Group A qualifying, Vorbe scored important go-ahead goals for Haiti, notably against Honduras and incidentally was named the top scorer of the qualification rounds.

Vorbe made his senior debut for Haiti in a 3–1 against Saint Vincent and the Grenadines in a Caribbean Championship match on November 4, 2010.

Personal life
Jean Francis Fabien Vorbe hails from one of the most notable footballing families in Haitian history, previously producing such stars as Charles, Sébastien and Philippe Vorbe.

Honours
NEROCA
I-League runner-up: 2017–18

Tempête FC
Ligue Haïtienne: 2011

Regional
CFU Youth Cup (U-16) runner-up: 2006

References

External links

Fabien Vorbe profile at Furman Paladins' site

1990 births
Living people
Haitian footballers
Haitian expatriate footballers
Haitian expatriate sportspeople in Canada
Haitian expatriate sportspeople in Peru
Haitian expatriate sportspeople in Sweden
Haiti international footballers
Haitian people of Mulatto descent
Furman Paladins men's soccer players
FC Edmonton players
Expatriate soccer players in Canada
North American Soccer League players
Tempête FC players
Ligue Haïtienne players
Peruvian Segunda División players
Association football midfielders
Haitian expatriate sportspeople in India